The Malaysia M4 League is a third tier football league in the Malaysian football league system. The league was created in 2018 as part of the Malaysian Football League's plan to reform the Malaysian football league structure.

After a rebranding of the Malaysian Football League (MFL) in March 2018, the company announced a reform of lower league competitions in Malaysia. In 2019, a new subsidiary of the company was formed, known as the Amateur Football League (AFL) which was tasked to manage the third division and below. The AFL officially confirmed the formation of the Malaysia M3 League and Malaysia M4 League as the third and fourth divisions of the Malaysian football league system.

A total of 14 clubs were confirmed to compete in the inaugural season of the newly reformed third division, the Malaysia M3 League, which replaced the former Malaysia FAM League while the 5 FA state leagues and 9 social leagues ran in parallel to form the Malaysia M4 League.

Starting in 2023, the Malaysia M4 League will renew its format as it will be nationwide-single league, participated by champions of AFL-approved state or district leagues from Malaysia M5 League and relegated teams from Malaysia M3 League.

History

Origins

Football arrived in Malaysia (British Malaya at that time) as courtesy of the British. The locals soon picked up the game, and before long it was the country's leading and most popular sport. Towards the end of the 19th century, football was one of the central pillars of most sports clubs in Malaya. However, it was not structured. Even when the Selangor Amateur Football League (SAFL) took shape in 1905 – which ensured proper administration and organisation – the competition was confined only to clubs in Kuala Lumpur.

The earliest recorded state football league took place in Penang, where YMCA won the league in 1909. The other earliest recorded winners of state football leagues were Johor in 1922 (P.W.D.A.A.), Malacca in 1929 (Malacca Chinese FA), Negeri Sembilan in 1929 (Nilai Club), Perak in 1932 (Perak Chinese RC) and Selangor in 1935 (Rangers). Alongside the leagues, cup competitions also took place.

By 1933 the administration for the football in Malaya was founded as the Football Association of Malaya (FAM), which managed the local football scene at that time. By 1954, the FAM joined FIFA as a member of the AFC.

Malaysia consists of thirteen states and three federal territories, separated by the South China Sea, with eleven states and two federal territories (Kuala Lumpur and Putrajaya) in Peninsular Malaysia, and two states and one federal territory (Labuan) in East Malaysia (Borneo). Each state has its own sets of football leagues, and some may have multiple divisions with promotion and relegation rules among them. All leagues in all states run in parallel.

The leagues have a hierarchical format with promotion and relegation between league divisions at different levels, allowing even the smallest club the hypothetical possibility of ultimately rising to the very top of the system. The exact number of clubs varies from year to year as clubs join and leave leagues or fold altogether, but an estimated average of 10 clubs per division implies that hundreds of teams are members of a league in the Malaysian men's football league system.

For the 2021 season, the AFL has announced the format changes for the Malaysia M3 and M4 Leagues in preparation for the transition to semi-professional status.

Overview 
The state football league systems consists of a pyramid of leagues, bound together by the principle of promotion and relegation. A certain number of the most successful clubs in each league can rise to a higher league, whilst those that finish at the bottom of their league can find themselves sinking to lower leagues. In addition to sporting performance, promotion is usually contingent on meeting criteria set by the higher league, especially concerning appropriate facilities and finances.

The top three levels contain one division each and are nationwide in scope. Below this, the levels have progressively more parallel leagues, which each cover progressively smaller geographic areas. Many leagues have more than one division. At the lower levels the existence of leagues becomes intermittent. There are also leagues in various parts of the country which are not officially part of the system as they do not have formal agreements with the football associations and are run by independent organizers.

Clubs from state leagues may, if they feel they meet the appropriate standard of play and have suitable facilities, apply to join a league which does form part of the system.

State level competition 
A state level competition is contested in 13 different states and three federal territories in Malaysia. While some states have an active league with a multiple divisions, others might be dormant or might only have a short duration cup competition in its place. The reason for the lack of a proper league system in some states and federal territories are due to the lack of proper management, marketing and funding from the football association in charge.

District level competition 
A district level competition is contested among clubs in the districts located in each state in Malaysia. It is run by the district football associations. Only certain districts currently have known and active leagues or cup competitions in place.

Clubs

2023 
Below are the list of clubs who will join the 2023 season, based on the status gained from 2022 Malaysia M3 League and 2022 Malaysia M5 League.

Promotion and relegation rules for the top four levels 
 Malaysia Super League (level 1, 14 teams):  The bottom two teams are relegated. No relegation  for 2023 season.
 Malaysia M2 League (level 2, 12 teams):  The top two automatically promoted. The bottom two are relegated. The league not running in 2023
 Malaysia M3 League (level 3, 14 teams): The top two teams are automatically promoted to Super League. Sometimes, teams might withdraw for financial reasons and might be given permission to play in their State Leagues.
 Malaysia M4 League (level 4, 15 clubs).

League system 2019

The table below shows the current structure of the system. For each division, its official name, sponsorship name (which differs from its historic name) and number of clubs is given. At levels 1–3, each division promotes to the division(s) that lie directly above it and relegates to the division(s) that lie directly below it. Below that level, individual league articles detail promotion and relegation arrangements.

Unlike most countries that play football as a main game, the league system in Malaysia still consists of representatives from state associations, clubs from companies, ministries or government agencies.

The Malaysia M4 League is at level 4 of the pyramid that is made up of a combination of leagues consisting of state FA leagues, social leagues and community leagues in Malaysia. They are administered and operated by their state football associations or independent operators. The level immediately above is the Malaysia M3 League. The divisions included are:

 Note: League names highlighted in bold are level 4 football leagues in the Malaysian football pyramid

Play-off champions and runners-up

See also
 Liga Semi-Pro
 Liga Premier
 Liga Super
 Piala FA
 Piala Malaysia
 FAM Football Awards

References

External links 

History of football in Malaysia
4